Xukuru may refer to:
 Xukuru people, an ethnic group of Brazil
 Xukuru language, the language formerly spoken by them